Alfredo Sánchez Brell (23 February 1931 – 10 July 2010), known as Aldo Sambrell, was a Spanish actor, director, and producer who appeared in over 150 films between 1961 and 1996.

Biography
Sambrell was born in Vallecas, Madrid, on 23 February 1931. He travelled to Mexico because his parents were exiled there, beginning a football career in Puebla F.C., where he was known as Madrileño Sánchez, and also in C.F. Monterrey. When he returned to Spain he played for Alcoyano and Rayo Vallecano, and finally worked as an actor.

Career
Sambrell was best known in the world of cinema for his roles as henchmen in Sergio Leone's Spaghetti Western films, portraying gang members in the trilogy of films A Fistful of Dollars (1964), For a Few Dollars More, (1965) and The Good, the Bad and the Ugly (1966), as well as in Once Upon a Time in the West in 1968, and 100 Rifles in 1969. He also played the part of firing squad leader in A Fistful of Dynamite (1971), and a member of Sinbad's crew in The Golden Voyage of Sinbad (1973). He also appeared alongside Jackie Chan in Armour of God 2: Operation Condor; he plays a villain here.

He acted in many other westerns, including Sergio Corbucci's Navajo Joe. He appeared in several  international productions as an extra or bit actor, including Doctor Zhivago and The Wind and the Lion.

He died in Alicante, Spain on 10 July 2010 from a cerebral infarction, at age 79, the result of three strokes he suffered in early June. He was cremated and his ashes were spread on Fort Bravo, Tabernas.

He was married to Cándida López Cano, with whom he had a son, and Sergio Leone was his best man.

Filmography

 King of Kings (1961) – Judea Soldier (uncredited)
 Implacable Three (1963) – Hombre de Bardon 
 Duello nel Texas (1963) – Juan Guardo
 Gunfighters of Casa Grande (1964) – Rojo, Bandit Chief
 Gunfight at High Noon (1964) – Palmer Henchman
 Fuera de la ley (1964) – Sheriff 
 Apache Fury (1964) – Secuaz de Burt (uncredited)
 A Fistful of Dollars (1964) – Dougy, Rojo gang member 
 Texas Ranger (1964) – Carson
 La tumba del pistolero (1964) – Minero
 Doomed Fort (1964) – James
 Adventures of the Bengal Lancers (1964) – Gamal / Sikki Dharma
 100 Horsemen (1964) – Alfaqui (uncredited)
 Saul e David (1964)
 Relevo para un pistolero (1964) – Gordon
 Finger on the Trigger (1965)
 The Hell of Manitoba (1965) – Jake
 Son of a Gunfighter (1965) – Juan Morales, Bandit Chief
 La magnifica sfida (1965) – Kames
 In a Colt's Shadow (1965) – Ramirez 
 For a Few Dollars More (1965) – Cuchillo (Indio's Gang)
 Doctor Zhivago (1965) – (uncredited)
 Fuerte perdido (1965)
 One Hundred Thousand Dollars for Lassiter (1966) – Rick, Martin Henchman
 Lost Command (1966) – Ibrahim
 Dynamite Jim (1966) – Slate
 The Sea Pirate (1966) – Le marin 'La bombarde'
 The Texican (1966) – Gil Rio
 Navajo Joe (1966) – Mervyn 'Vee' Duncan
 Il grande colpo di Surcouf (1966) – Le marin 'La Bombarde'
 The Good, the Bad and the Ugly (1966) – Member of Angel Eyes' Gang
 A Bullet for the General (1967) – Lt. Alvaro Ferreira
 The Cruel Ones (1967) – Pedro 
 The Long Duel (1967) – Prem 
 Face to Face (1967) – Zachary Shawn 
 15 Scaffolds for a Murderer (1967) – Danny / Bud Lee
 Train for Durango (1968) – Captain of Mexican Army
 Superargo and the Faceless Giants (1968) – Kamir / Pao-Ki 
 A Long Ride from Hell (1968) – Mexican Bounty Hunter
 A Minute to Pray, a Second to Die (1968) – Jesús María (uncredited)
 Requiem for a Gringo (1968) – Charley Fair
 Giugno '44 – Sbarcheremo in Normandia (1968)
 Once Upon a Time in the West (1968) – Cheyenne's Lieutenant (uncredited)
 White Comanche (1968) – (uncredited)
 Colpo sensazionale al servizio del Sifar (1968) – Scarabesca
 100 Rifles (1969) – Sgt. Paletes
 Battle of the Commandos (1969) – Sgt. Karim Habinda
 Tristana (1970) – (uncredited)
 Manos torpes (1970)
 Arizona Colt Returns (1970) – Chico
 Cannon for Cordoba (1970) – Ortega (uncredited)
 When Heroes Die (1970) – James
 Kill Django... Kill First (1971) – Burton
 A Town Called Hell (1971) – Calebra
 The Last Run (1971) – Miguel
 The Light at the Edge of the World (1971) – Tarcante
 Duck, You Sucker! (1971) – Mexican Officer (uncredited)
 Hannie Caulder (1971) – Mexican Soldier (uncredited)
 Bad Man's River (1971) – Canales
 Kill (1971) – Carcopino
 Su le mani, cadavere! Sei in arresto (1971) – Lee Grayton 
 Rain for a Dusty Summer (1971) – Col. Marinos
 Ben and Charlie (1972) – Sheriff Walkers (uncredited)
 Antony and Cleopatra (1972) – Ventidius
 Treasure Island (1972) – Israel Hands
 Travels with My Aunt (1972) – Hakim's Assistant (uncredited)
 Partirono preti, tornarono... curati (1973) – Commanding officer on the train shouting out of the windows (uncredited)
 Charley One-Eye (1973) – Mexican Driver
 Shaft in Africa (1973) – Angelo
 The Man Called Noon (1973) – Kissling
 The Golden Voyage of Sinbad (1973) – Omar
 Vudú sangriento (1974) – Guedé Nibo
 La loba y la Paloma (1974) – Atrilio
 La dynamite est bonne à boire (1974)
 The Wind and the Lion (1975) – Ugly Arab
 La última jugada (1975) – Alan Randall
 Atraco en la jungla (1976) – Insp. Ramirez
 A mí qué me importa que explote Miami (1976)
 The Black Pearl (1977) – Sailor
 El perro (1977) – Omar Romero
 Silver Saddle (1978) – Garrincha
 Süpermenler (1979) – Baba Jackson
 Missile X: The Neutron Bomb Incident (1979) – George
 Savana violenza carnale (1979)
 Caboblanco (1980) – Policeman
 Monster (1980) – Carlos
 Matar para vivir (1980)
 Cuatro locos buscan manicomio (1980) – Estranguloni
 L'ultimo harem (1981) – Bedouin Chief (uncredited)
 La leyenda del tambor (1981) – General Schwartz
 Las muñecas del King Kong (1981) – Damian
 Messo comunale praticamente spione (1982) – Romolo Rossi
 Kapax del Amazonas (1982)
 Los diablos del mar (1982) – Negoro
 Biancaneve & Co. (1982) – Re Agesilao
 Satan's Baby Doll (1982) – Antonio Aguilar
 Black Commando (1982) – Col. Montano
 Al oeste de Río Grande (1983) – Juan Sanchez
 I padroni del mondo (1983)
 Tuareg – The Desert Warrior (1984) – Sgt. Malick
 Goma-2 (1984) – Picot
 Yellow Hair and the Fortress of Gold (1984) – Flores 
 Héctor, el estigma del miedo (1984) – Padre de Héctor
 Roma. L'antica chiave dei sensi (1984)
 Mon ami Washington (1984)
 Tex and the Lord of the Deep (1985) – El Dorado
 Hierro dulce (1985)
 La noche de la ira (1986) – Sebastián
 El orden cómico (1986)
 Instant Justice (1986) – Lt. Juan Muñoz 
 Ahora mis pistolas hablan (1986)
 Ladrón de chatarra (1987)
 El ataque de los pájaros (1987) – Arthur Neilson
 The Rogues (1987) – Il ricettatore (uncredited)
 Abat-jour (1988) – Antonio
 Flavia (1989) – Valerio Augusto
 Al Andalus (1989)
 The Return of the Musketeers (1989) – Burly Demonstrator
 Blood and Sand (1989) – Faustino
 El río que nos lleva (1989)
 Hot Blood (1989) – Don Luis
 Rose Bluelight (1989)
 Commando terrorista (1990)
 Superagentes en Mallorca (1990)
 La cruz de Iberia (1990) – Capitán Guardia Civil
 Armour of God 2: Operation Condor (1991) – Adolf 
 Caged – Le prede umane (1991) – Capt. Juan
 Narcos (1992) – Boss
 Men of War (1994) – Goldmouth 
 Dis-moi oui (1995) – Le grand-père
 Bambola di carne (1995) – Frank / Jenny's fiancé / Lolette's father
 Soldato ignoto (1995) – American soldier
 Killer Barbys (1996) – Arkan
 Aquí llega Condemor, el pecador de la pradera (1996) – Valerio
 Pasajes (1996) – Guarda
 Tender Flesh (1997) – Kallman
 Ma il buon Dio è proprio in gamba? (1998)
 Killer Barbys vs. Dracula (2002) – Pepe Morgan
 Flesh for the Beast (2003) – Alfred Fischer
 Legami sporchi (2004) – Tito

References

External links

 

1931 births
2010 deaths
20th-century Spanish male actors
Male Spaghetti Western actors
Male actors from Madrid
Spanish film directors
Spanish film producers
Spanish male film actors